Maher Al-Taweel (born January 2, 1982 in Damascus) is a Syrian footballer. He currently plays as a defender for Al-Wahda.

References
http://www.goalzz.com/main.aspx?player=38436

1982 births
Living people
Syrian footballers
Sportspeople from Damascus
Association football defenders
Syrian Premier League players